The ITU-T Study Group 16 (SG16) is a statutory group of the ITU Telecommunication Standardization Sector (ITU-T) concerned with multimedia coding, systems and applications, such as video coding standards. It is responsible for standardization of the "H.26x" line of video coding standards, the "T.8xx" line of image coding standards, and related technologies, as well as various collaborations with the World Health Organization, including on safe listing (H.870) accessibility of e-health (F.780.2), it is also the parent body of VCEG and various Focus Groups, such as the ITU-WHO Focus Group on Artificial Intelligence for Health.

Administratively, SG16  is a statutory meeting of the World Telecommunication Standardization Assembly (WTSA), which creates the ITU-T Study Groups and appoints their management teams. The secretariat is provided by the Telecommunication Standardization Bureau (under Director Chaesub Lee). WTSA instructed ITU to hold the Global Standards Symposium as a part of the deliberations that is open to the public.

The goal of SG16 is to produce Recommendations (international standards) for multimedia, including e.g. video coding, audio coding and image coding methods, such as H.264, H.265, H.266, and JPEG, as well as other types of multimedia related standards such as F.780.2 and H.870 on safe listening, together with the World Health Organization. It is also responsible for "the coordination of related studies across the various ITU-T SGs." Additionally, is also the lead study group on ubiquitous and Internet of Things (IoT) applications; telecommunication/ICT accessibility for persons with disabilities; intelligent transport system (ITS) communications; e-health; and Internet Protocol television (IPTV).

Trustworthy AI 
Together with ITU-T Study Group 17 and AI for Good, the study group has been developing technology specifications under Trustworthy AI. Including items on homomorphic encryption, secure multi-party computation, and federated learning.

See also
ITU Telecommunication Standardization Sector
Joint Photographic Experts Group (JPEG)
Video Coding Experts Group (VCEG)
Moving Picture Experts Group (MPEG)
Thomas Wiegand
Gary Sullivan (engineer)
Video codec
Video compression
Video quality

References

External links 
 ITU main site
 ITU-T Study Group 16 web site
 structure of ITU-T Study Group 16
 Official JPEG and JBIG web site
 Official MPEG web site
 

International Telecommunication Union
Multimedia